Babita Kumari Phogat (born 20 November 1989) is an Indian wrestler, who won the gold medal in 2014 Commonwealth Games. She also won silver medals at 2018 Commonwealth Games and 2010 Commonwealth Games and a bronze medal at the 2012 World Wrestling Championships. Babita Phogat entered politics by joining the Bharatiya Janata Party in 2019.

Personal life and family 

Babita is the younger sister of Geeta Phogat, who won India's first gold medal in women's wrestling at the Commonwealth Games. Babita is the daughter of wrestler and Dronacharya Award recipient Mahavir Singh Phogat. She has a cousin Vinesh Phogat who also won gold, in the 48 kg category, at the Commonwealth Games in Glasgow.

Babita, along with her sister and cousin, have contributed to a change in mindset and attitude towards girls and women in home-state Haryana and rest of the nation.

Her youngest sister, Ritu Phogat, too is an international level wrestler and has won a gold medal at the 2016 Commonwealth Wrestling Championship. Her younger sister, Sangita Phogat is also a wrestler.

In June 2019, she announced her engagement to fellow wrestler Vivek Suhag, whom she later married in November of the same of year. 

Babita Phogat joined the BJP on Monday 12 August 2019 but lost her first election. She and her husband welcomed their first child, a baby boy, on January 11, 2021.

Career

2009 Commonwealth Wrestling Championship 
In the tournament in Jalandhar, Punjab, Babita won the gold medal in the women's freestyle 51 kg category.

2010 Commonwealth Games 
At the 2010 Commonwealth Games, Babita won the silver medal in the women's freestyle 51 kg category after being defeated by Ifeoma Christi Nwoye of Nigeria in the gold medal match with the score of 0–2, 4–5.

2011 Commonwealth Wrestling Championship 
In the tournament held in Melbourne, Australia, Babita won the gold medal in the women's freestyle 48 kg category.

2012 World Wrestling Championships 
In the Round of 16 of the 2012 World Wrestling Championships, Babita faced Hsin-Ju Chiu of Taipei whom she beat 5:0. Her quarter-finals opponent was Risako Kawai of Japan whom she beat 5:0 to qualify for the semi-finals. She lost 1:3 to Jessica Anne Marie MacDonald of Canada in the semi-finals. She was then able to contest for the bronze medal which she won in the women's freestyle 51 kg category by beating Zamira Rakhmanova of Russia 5:0.

2013 Asian Wrestling Championships 
At the 2013 Asian Wrestling Championships tournament in New Delhi, India, Babita won the bronze medal in the women's freestyle 55 kg category along with Han Kum-ok of North Korea.

2014 Commonwealth Games 
In the women's freestyle 55 kg category at the 2014 Commonwealth Games, Babita's first opponent in the quarter-finals was Kathryn Marsh of Scotland whom she beat 9–2, 4–0 (classification points 4:1). Her opponent in the semi-finals was Louisa Porogovska of England whom she beat 2–0 (classification points 5:0) – victory by fall (wrestling terminology). In the gold medal bout, she was up against Brittanee Laverdure of Canada whom she beat 5–0, 4–2 (classification points 3:1) to win the gold medal.

2014 Asian Games 
Babita was not able to repeat her Commonwealth Games feat at the 2014 Asian Games in Incheon, South Korea. In the Round of 16 of the women's freestyle 55 kg category, she faced Srey Mao Dorn of Mongolia whom she beat 5:0. In the quarter-finals, she faced Aiym Abdildina of Kazakhstan whom she beat 3:1. She lost 0:4 to Olympic champion Saori Yoshida of Japan in the semi-finals. She was able to contest for the bronze medal but lost 1:3 to her opponent Xuechun Zhong of China.

2015 Asian Wrestling Championships 
Babita defeated Abdy Kadyrova Elsa of Kyrgyzstan 10–0 in the quarterfinal of the 2015 Asian Wrestling Championships, after getting the better of Zukhra Mustanova of Uzbekistan by the same margin in the qualification round. Babita failed to enter the final as she lost her semifinal bout to Pak Yong-Mi of North Korea, losing in the last five seconds.

With a chance for a podium finish, Babita lost to Zhuldyz Eshimova-Turtbayeva of Kazakhstan 3–6 in the bronze medal play-off.

2016 Rio Olympics 
Babita became the third and final entry from India in the women's wrestling for the 2016 Summer Olympics in Rio de Janeiro. She represented India along with her cousin Vinesh Phogat. She qualified for the Rio Games after her opponent failed a doping test in the qualifying tournament and the quota was given to India.

Babita lost in the first round 1–5.

2018 Gold Coast Commonwealth Games 
Babita Kumari Phogat won the silver medal in women's 53 kg freestyle wrestling at 2018 Commonwealth Games in Gold Coast.

Popular culture
The film Dangal is loosely based on the story of her and her sister which released on 23 December 2016. Babita was portrayed by Sanya Malhotra and her younger self by Suhani Bhatnagar.

Politics
She joined the Bharatiya Janata Party in August 2019 professing to be strongly influenced by Prime Minister Narendra Modi. She lost to Sombir Sangwan in October 2019 in Haryana assembly elections from Dadri (Haryana Vidhan Sabha constituency).

Filmography

Television

Other titles 
 Dave Schultz Memorial Tournament, 2010 – Sixth place
 Dave Schultz Memorial Tournament, 2012 – Bronze
 Dave Schultz Memorial Tournament, 2014 – Silver

See also 
 Geeta Phogat

References

External links 
 Babita Kumari – FILA database

Indian female sport wrestlers
Sportswomen from Haryana
Living people
Wrestlers at the 2010 Commonwealth Games
Commonwealth Games silver medallists for India
Wrestlers at the 2014 Commonwealth Games
Commonwealth Games gold medallists for India
Wrestlers at the 2014 Asian Games
1989 births
World Wrestling Championships medalists
Wrestlers at the 2016 Summer Olympics
Olympic wrestlers of India
Commonwealth Games medallists in wrestling
21st-century Indian women
21st-century Indian people
Female sport wrestlers from Haryana
Phogat sisters
Asian Games competitors for India
Bharatiya Janata Party politicians from Haryana
Recipients of the Arjuna Award
Asian Wrestling Championships medalists
Medallists at the 2010 Commonwealth Games
Medallists at the 2014 Commonwealth Games